Musharraf Ali Farooqi (born 26 July 1968) is a Pakistani-Canadian author, translator, and storyteller. Farooqi was among the five writers shortlisted for Asia's most prestigious literary prize in 2012. In addition to his fiction and translation projects, he is working on establishing an Urdu language publishing program specializing in children's literature and classics. He founded the publishing house KITAB (2012), launched the online index Urdu Thesaurus (2016), and designed the interactive storytelling and reading initiative STORYKIT Program (2016). These three projects have been integrated in an activity-based learning program for children.

The Merman and the Book of Power: A Qissa is his newest work.

Biography
Farooqi received his early education in Hyderabad, at St Bonaventure's High School. He later attended Model School and College in Hyderabad, Sindh and, afterwards, NED University of Engineering and Technology in Karachi for three years, though he did not finish his degree.

Farooqi is the author of the novel Between Clay And Dust, which was shortlisted for the Man Asian Literary Prize. His earlier novel, The Story of a Widow, was shortlisted for the 2011 DSC Prize for South Asian Literature and considered for the 2010 International Dublin Literary Award. Rabbit Rap is a modernist fable for young adults. His children's books includes the collection The Amazing Moustaches of Moochhander the Iron Man and Other Stories, illustrated by Michelle Farooqi, which was shortlisted for the India ComicCon Award in the "Best Publication for Children" category, and the picture book The Cobbler's Holiday: or Why Ants Don't Wear Shoes.

Farooqi's translation of the 1871 version of Dastan-e Amir Hamza (Adventures of Amir Hamza) by Ghalib Lakhnavi and Abdullah Bilgrami was published in October 2007. He published the first book of a projected 24-volume translation of the world's first magical fantasy epic, Hoshruba, in 2009. A selection from his translation of contemporary Urdu poet Afzal Ahmed Syed's poetry was published by the Wesleyan University Press Poetry Series in 2010.

Awards and honours

Finalist, 2012 Man Asian Literary Prize, for the novel Between Clay and Dust
2011 PEN/Heim Translation Fund Grant for Hoshruba: The Prisoner of Batin, translated from the Urdu
Finalist, 2011 DSC Prize, for The Story of a Widow
Fellow, Harvard South Asia Institute, Spring 2017
Former Member Executive Committee, Board of Governors of the Archaeology and Literary Heritage Endowment Fund of the Government of Pakistan
PEN/Heim Translation Fund Grant 2011 for Hoshruba

Bibliography

Novels
Between Clay and Dust: A Novel (Aleph Book Company, 2012)
The Story of a Widow (Alfred A. Knopf, 2008)
Salar Jang's Passion (Summersdale Publishers, UK, 2002; HarperCollins India, 2001)

Qissas 
 The Merman and the Book of Power - (Aleph Book Company, 2019)
 The Jinn Darazgosh (2010)

Children's fiction 
 Monster Folktales from Pakistan -
 Tik-Tik: The Master of Time – children's novel
 Rabbit Rap (Viking/Penguin Books India, 2012) – an illustrated novel with art by Michelle Farooqi
 The Amazing Moustaches of Moochhander the Iron Man & Other Stories (Puffin India, 2011) – illustrated by Michelle Farooqi
 The Cobbler's Holiday: or Why Ants Don’t Wear Shoes (Roaring Brook Press, 2008)

Translations 
Rococo and Other Worlds – Selected Poetry of Afzal Ahmed Syed (Wesleyan University Press Poetry Series, 2010)
The Beast (Tranquebar Press/Westland Books, 2010) – translation of Syed Muhammad Ashraf's Urdu novella Numberdar ka Neela
Hoshruba: The Land and the Tilism (2009) – originally published (1883–1893) in Urdu as Tilism-e Hoshruba by Muhammad Husain Jah and Ahmed Husain Qamar
The Adventures of Amir Hamza (2007) – originally written in Urdu by Ghalib Lakhnavi
The Adventures of Amir Hamza 
Mouse Pickle (2012)
Three Sindhi Folktales (2014)</ref>
 Chhabili the Innkeeper
 The Ingenious Farkhanda and the Two Conditions
 The Adventures of a Trickster Woman
 The Adventures of a Soldier
 The Victim of Malice
 The Qissa of Azar Shah and Saman Rukh Bano
 قصّہ آذر شاہ و سمن رُخ بانو
 قصّۂ مقتولِ جفا
 قصّہ شہزادی فرخندہ کا
 قصّہ ایک عیّارہ کا

Folktale retellings in Urdu 
 پیٹو ریچھ اور شاندار کھچڑی 2019
 بینگن شہزادی 2019
 مٹریا اور پٹریا 2019
 جوں چٹ پٹ 2018
 پودنا اور پودنی 2017

Essays

References

External links

Canadian people of Pakistani descent
Pakistani novelists
Pakistani scholars
Pakistani translators
People from Hyderabad District, Pakistan
Translators from Urdu
Urdu–English translators
1968 births
Living people
NED University of Engineering & Technology alumni
Writers from Karachi
Canadian writers of Asian descent